Noortje Tabak (born 13 July 1988 in Bergeijk) is a road cyclist from the Netherlands. Her first international appearance was in 2006 when she represented as a junior the Netherlands at the 2006 European Road Championships. At the 2010 European Road Championships she won the under-23 women's road race. She competed later the year in the women's road race at the 2010 UCI Road World Championships, finishing 32nd.

See also
 2009 DSB Bank-LTO season

References

External links
 profile at procyclingstats.com
 profile at dewielersite.nl

1988 births
Dutch female cyclists
UCI Road World Championships cyclists for the Netherlands
People from Bergeijk
Living people
Cyclists from North Brabant